René Mercet (December 1, 1898 – June 13, 1961) was a Swiss international referee in the 1920s and 1930s. He is known for having refereed the Italy v Spain replayed quarter-final in the 1934. René Mercet is accused of having allowed an irregular goal from Meazza, then of having refused 2 others for Spain. "The referee conducted the operations with such casualness that he frequently appeared to be Italy's twelfth man" reads the summary of the french sports daily L'Auto. After his return to Switzerland, he was struck off by the Swiss Football Association and FIFA. FIFA World Cup.

References

1898 births
FIFA World Cup referees
Year of death unknown
1934 FIFA World Cup referees
Swiss football referees
1961 deaths